Admetula atopodonta is a species of sea snail, a marine gastropod mollusk in the family Cancellariidae, the nutmeg snails.

Description

Distribution

References

 Verhecken A. (1997) Mollusca Gastropoda: Arafura Sea Cancellariidae collected during the Karubar cruise. In: A. Crosnier & P. Bouchet (eds), Résultats des campagnes Musorstom, volume 16. Mémoires du Muséum National d'Histoire Naturelle 172: 295–323. page(s): 299
 Petit, R.E. & Harasewych, M.G. (2005) Catalogue of the superfamily Cancellarioidea Forbes and Hanley, 1851 (Gastropoda: Prosobranchia)- 2nd edition. Zootaxa, 1102, 3–161. NIZT 682
 Hemmen J. (2007). Recent Cancellariidae. Wiesbaden, 428pp
 Verhecken A. (2011) The Cancellariidae of the Panglao Marine Biodiversity Project 2004 and the Panglao 2005 and Aurora 2007 deep sea cruises in the Philippines, with description of six new species (Neogastropoda, Cancellarioidea). Vita Malacologica 9: 1–60. [Published 31 May 2011]

External links

Cancellariidae
Gastropods described in 1986